Associazione Sportiva Dilettantistica Atletico Boville Ernica (formerly A.S.D. Boville Ernica Calcio), usually referred to as simply Atletico Boville is an Italian association football club located in Boville Ernica, Lazio. It currently plays in  Eccellenza Lazio.

History 
The club was founded in 1994 as Boville Ernica Calcio and renamed in 2011 with the current name.

In the season 2011–12 it was relegated to Eccellenza.

Colors and badge 
The team's color are red and blue.

References

External links
Official homepage

Football clubs in Italy
Football clubs in Lazio
Association football clubs established in 1994
1994 establishments in Italy